Harpalus erosus is a species of ground beetle in the subfamily Harpalinae. It was described by Mannerheim in 1825.

References

erosus
Beetles described in 1825